Cosmoclostis auxileuca is a moth of the family Pterophoridae. It is found in Assam, India.

References

Pterophorini
Moths described in 1908
Plume moths of Asia